Patli is a moderate sized village situated  from Talwandi Bhai in Firozpur district of Punjab, India.

References

External links
 Patli at WikiMapia

villages in Firozpur district